Gazumun (also Romanized as Gazūmūn; also known as Gazdūmān) is a village in Nimbeluk Rural District, Nimbeluk District, Qaen County, South Khorasan Province, Iran. At the 2006 census, its population was 92, in 20 families.

References 

Populated places in Qaen County